Events in the year 2020 in the United Arab Emirates.

Incumbents
 President: Khalifa bin Zayed Al Nahyan
 Prime Minister: Mohammed bin Rashid Al Maktoum

Events 
January 30 – COVID-19 pandemic in the United Arab Emirates
The Emirati government confirmed the first cases related to the COVID-19 pandemic in the United Arab Emirates.
 August 13 – Israel and the UAE agree to normalise relations, marking the third Israel–Arab peace deal.
 September 19 - IPL 2020 was hosted in UAE.

Deaths

References

 
Years of the 21st century in the United Arab Emirates
United Arab Emirates
United Arab Emirates
2020s in the United Arab Emirates